Aloeides kaplani, the Kaplan's copper, is a species of butterfly in the family Lycaenidae. It is endemic to South Africa, where it is known from the Western Cape. It was discovered and described in 1977.

The wingspan is 28–32 mm for males and 30–40 mm for females. Adults are on wing from September to December, with a peak in October. There is one generation per year.

References

Aloeides
Butterflies described in 1977
Endemic butterflies of South Africa
Taxonomy articles created by Polbot